Vrije Stemmen (Free Voices) was the name of several newspapers in Zeeland, Netherlands:
 Vrije Stemmen uit Schouwen-Duiveland (Zierikzee, 1945–47),  a temporary name for the Zierikzeesche Nieuwsbode
 Vrije Stemmen uit de Ganzestad, dagblad te Goes (Goes, 1944–45). In 1945 changed its name to:
 Vrije Stemmen. Dagblad voor Zeeland (Goes, 1945–46). In 1946 merged into the Provinciale Zeeuwse Courant.

Defunct newspapers published in the Netherlands